Divine Ahmad Deablo (born August 17, 1998) is an American football outside linebacker for the Las Vegas Raiders of the National Football League (NFL). He played college football at Virginia Tech and was drafted by the Raiders in the third round of the 2021 NFL Draft.

Early life and high school
Deablo grew up in Winston-Salem, North Carolina, and attended Mount Tabor High School. He was named All-Central Piedmont Conference at wide receiver in each of his final three seasons as well as All-Northwest North Carolina in his senior season after averaging 21 yards per reception with 10 touchdown receptions. As a senior, Deablo committed to play college football at Virginia Tech over offers from North Carolina and N.C. State.

College career
Deablo was a member of the Virginia Tech Hokies for five seasons. He played in all of the team's games as a true freshman, playing mostly on special teams and catching one pass for eight yards. Following his freshman year, Deablo moved to the safety position from wide receiver. Deablo saw significant playing time in the Hokies defensive backfield rotation to start his sophomore year before suffering a foot injury in the fourth game of the season and using a medical redshirt.

Deablo finished his redshirt junior season as Virginia Tech's second-leading tackler with 84. He was also named the Atlantic Coast Conference (ACC) Defensive Back of the Week in week 10 after recovering a fumble and returning it 98 yards for a touchdown against Notre Dame. As a redshirt senior, Deablo had 55 tackles with four interceptions and four passes broken up and was named first-team All-ACC.

Professional career

Deablo was selected by the Las Vegas Raiders in the third round (80th overall) of the 2021 NFL Draft. Deablo signed his four-year rookie contract with Las Vegas on July 23, 2021. He played in all 17 games with five starts as a rookie, recording 45 tackles.

Deablo entered the 2022 season as a starting linebacker for the Raiders. He started the first eight games, leading the team in tackles over that span, before being placed on injured reserve on November 7, 2022.

References

External links
Virginia Tech Hokies bio

Living people
Virginia Tech Hokies football players
Players of American football from Winston-Salem, North Carolina
American football safeties
Las Vegas Raiders players
American football linebackers
1998 births